Southwest Research Institute (SwRI), headquartered in San Antonio, Texas, is an independent and nonprofit applied research and development (R&D) organization. Founded in 1947 by oil businessman Tom Slick, it provides contract research and development services to government and industrial clients.

Description 

The institute consists of eleven technical divisions, The Center for Nuclear Waste Regulatory Analyses, a federally funded research and development center sponsored by the U.S. Nuclear Regulatory Commission, also operates on the SwRI grounds. More than 4,000 projects are active at the institute at any given time. These projects are funded between the government and commercial sectors. At the close of fiscal year 2021, the staff numbered approximately 3,000 employees and research volume was nearly $726 million. The institute provided more than $8 million to fund research through its internally sponsored R&D program.

A partial listing of research areas includes space science and engineering; automation, robotics, and intelligent systems; avionics and support systems; bioengineering; chemistry and chemical engineering; corrosion and electrochemistry; earth and planetary sciences; emissions research; engineering mechanics; fire technology; fluid systems and machinery dynamics; and fuels and lubricants. Additional areas include geochemistry; hydrology and geohydrology; materials sciences and fracture mechanics; nondestructive evaluation; oil and gas exploration; pipeline technology; surface modification and coatings; and vehicle, engine, and powertrain design, research, and development. In 2021, staff members published 872 papers in the technical literature and made 212 presentations at technical conferences, seminars and symposia around the world; and submitted 48 invention disclosures; filed 46 patent applications; and received 25 U.S. patent awards.

For 75 years, Southwest Research Institute has addressed challenges from deep sea to deep space and everywhere in between. For example, early work in submersibles has led to engineers developing remotely operated deep water rescue vehicles for the U.S. and Australian navies. SwRI is currently adapting extensive expertise in engines, fuels and lubricants for electrified powertrains and alternative fuels research. SwRI's initiatives in robotics and artificial intelligence enable automated vehicles, medical diagnostic support and industrial maintenance, including a mobile robot to remove coatings from commercial aircraft using laser ablation. 

SwRI operates a large space science and engineering program, which is home to principal investigators for five major NASA missions, including the Juno mission to Jupiter, the New Horizons mission to Pluto and the Kuiper belt, the Lucy mission to multiple Trojan asteroids near Jupiter, and the PUNCH mission to image the outer reaches of the solar corona.

SwRI's experience also includes advanced pharmaceuticals, direction finding antennas, cybersecurity solutions and aircraft and infrastructure life extension.

SwRI initiates contracts with clients based on consultations and prepares a formal proposal outlining the scope of work. Subject to client wishes, programs are kept confidential. As part of a long-held tradition, patent rights arising from sponsored research may be assigned to SwRI's clients. SwRI generally retains the rights to institute-funded advancements.

The institute's headquarters occupy more than 2.3 million square feet of office and laboratory space on more than 1,500 acres in San Antonio. SwRI has technical offices and laboratories in Boulder, Colorado; Ann Arbor, Michigan; Warner-Robins, Georgia; Ogden, Utah; Oklahoma City, Oklahoma; Rockville, Maryland; Minneapolis, Minnesota; Beijing, China; and other locations.

SwRI's technical magazine is published three times each year to spotlight the research and development projects currently underway. A complementary Technology Today podcast is also available.

In 1950, the institute was the focus of Research Ranch, a Screenliner short subject produced by RKO-Pathé studios.

Technical divisions 
The organization consists of eleven divisions, each with their own respective field:
 Applied Physics
 Applied Power
 Chemistry and Chemical Engineering
 Defense and Intelligence Solutions
 Fuels and Lubricants Research
 Intelligent Systems
 Mechanical Engineering
 Powertrain Engineering
 Space Systems
 Space Science
 Solar System Science

See also
 NESSUS Probabilistic Analysis Software
 Associated Universities, Inc.

References

External links
 
 Quick facts
 Product certification directory
 
 

Research institutes in Texas
Multidisciplinary research institutes
Companies based in San Antonio
Research institutes established in 1947
Independent research institutes
Non-profit organizations based in Texas
1947 establishments in Texas